is a railway station in the city of Nishio, Aichi, Japan, operated by Meitetsu.

Lines

Station layout
The station has two opposed side platforms connected by a level crossing with Platform 1 on a passing loop. The station has automated ticket machines, Manaca automated turnstiles and is unattended.

Platforms

Adjacent stations

Station history
Kami Yokosuka Station was opened on August 5, 1915, as a station on the privately held Nishio Railway. On December 21, 1926, the Nishio Railway merged with the Aichi Electric Railway, which was acquired by the Meitetsu Group on August 1, 1935. The station has been unattended since September 1988.

Passenger statistics
In fiscal 2017, the station was used by an average of 628 passengers daily (boarding passengers only).

Surrounding area
Yokosuka Elementary School

See also
 List of Railway Stations in Japan

References

External links

 Official web page 

Railway stations in Japan opened in 1915
Railway stations in Aichi Prefecture
Stations of Nagoya Railroad
Nishio, Aichi